Sodium zincate refers to anionic zinc oxides or hydroxides, depending on conditions. In the applications of these materials, the exact formula is not necessarily important and it is likely that aqueous zincate solutions consist of mixtures.

Hydroxyzincates
Solutions of sodium zincate may be prepared by dissolving zinc, zinc hydroxide, or zinc oxide in an aqueous solution of sodium hydroxide.  Simplified equations for these complex processes are:
ZnO  +  H2O  +  2 NaOH   →  Na2Zn(OH)4
Zn  +  2 H2O  +   2 NaOH   →  Na2Zn(OH)4  +  H2

From such solutions, one can crystallize salts of containing the anions Zn(OH)42−, Zn2(OH)62−, and Zn(OH)64−.  Na2Zn(OH)4 consists of tetrahedral zincate ion and octahedral sodium cations.  The salt Sr2Zn(OH)6 features zinc in an octahedral coordination sphere.

Oxozincates
Related oxides are also known such as Na2ZnO2, Na2Zn2O3, Na10Zn4O9.

References

Sodium compounds
Zinc compounds